Clyde Hefer (born 12 April 1961) is an Australian former rower - a two-time World Champion and Olympic medal winner.

Club and state rowing
Hefer's senior rowing was with the Drummoyne Rowing Club in Sydney. At the Australian Rowing Championships in 1979 he won a national championship title in a lightweight M4- with his brother Gary, Geoff Webb and Graeme Wearne. In 1980 Graham Gardiner joined Hefer at Drummoyne and at that year's nationals Hefer won two Australian championship titles  - the lightweight M2- with Gardiner and the lightweight M4- with Gardiner, Wearne and Michael Smith. In 1981 in those same two crews Hefer again raced for those same titles but this time representing the Balmain Rowing Club and both to 2nd place.

From 1982 Hefer was racing in the open weight division and was back at the Drummoyne Rowing Club from 1984 under coach Rusty Robertson.

National representative rowing
Hefer was selected for Australian representative honours in a LM4- for the 1980 World Rowing Championships in Hazewinkel - a lightweight only championship being an Olympic year. With Gardiner he'd vied for top national honours throughout 1980 against the Victorian pair of Charles Bartlett and Simon Gillett. New Australian National Coaching Director Reinhold Batschi had just introduced a small boat racing selection methodology and the choice of the two competitively matched pairs to comprise the Australian IV was clear. The crew took the gold medal and won Australia's second lightweight World Championship title. The following year in the same crew, Hefer raced at the 1981 World Rowing Championships in Munich and they successfully defended their title.

In 1984 Hefer along with half of the champion New South Wales Kings Cup crew were selected in the Olympic VIII for Los Angeles. Coached by Reinhold Batschi, stroked by Steve Evans and with Hefer in the two seat they brought home the bronze medal.

References

External links
 
 
 
 

1961 births
Living people
Australian male rowers
Rowers at the 1984 Summer Olympics
Olympic bronze medalists for Australia
Olympic medalists in rowing
World Rowing Championships medalists for Australia
Medalists at the 1984 Summer Olympics
20th-century Australian people